MRU may refer to:

Athletic organizations
 Malaysian Rugby Union, (Malay: Kesatuan Ragbi Malaysia) the governing body for rugby union in Malaysia
 Manawatu Rugby Union, the governing body of the sport of Rugby union in the Manawatu rugby province
 Manawhenua Rugby Union, a New Zealand rugby union team made from the Manawatu and Horowhenua provinces
 Marlborough Rugby Union, a New Zealand rugby union team that played from 1888 to 2005
 Mauritius Rugby Union, the governing body for rugby union in Mauritius

Computing
 Most Recently Used, a cache replacement algorithm
 Most Recently Used menu, a specific menu in Microsoft Windows;
 Maximum Receive Unit, see Maximum transmission unit

People
 Muhammad Rafi Usmani, a religious scholar in the Islamic Republic of Pakistan
 Mihai Răzvan Ungureanu (born 1968), Romanian historian, politician and former Prime Minister of Romania

Schools
 Mykolas Romeris University, in Lithuania
 Mount Royal University, in Calgary, Alberta, Canada
 Muteesa I Royal University, in Uganda

Other uses
 Mauritanian ouguiya, currency by ISO 4217 code
 MRU Holdings, a New York-based financial services company that specialized in higher education financing products
 Mano River Union, a political union in Africa
 Międzyrzecz Fortification Region (Polish:Międzyrzecki Rejon Umocniony), a military defence line in Western Poland
 Sir Seewoosagur Ramgoolam International Airport in Mauritius, IATA Code: MRU
 Motion Reference Unit, an inertial measurement technology

See also
Mru (disambiguation)